Story of Janghwa and Hongryeon  is a 1936 Korean silent film. The film is based on a popular Korean fairy tale "Janghwa Hongryeon jeon" which had been adapted into film versions in 1924, 1936, 1956, 1962 and 1972, 2003, and 2009.

Cast
Su-il Mun

Gyeong-sun Ji
Jong-cheol Lee

External links
 

1936 films
Pre-1948 Korean films
Korean silent films
Korean black-and-white films
Korean-language films
Films based on fairy tales
1936 horror films